The Columbus mayoral election of 1967 was the 73rd mayoral election in Columbus, Ohio.  During the primary nomination on May 2, 1967, the Columbus electorate nominated Republican Jerry Spears, Jr., a businessman from the  Hilltop neighborhood, and incumbent Democratic mayor Jack Sensenbrenner to compete in the mayoral election.  On Tuesday, November 7, 1967, mayor Jack Sensenbrenner defeated Jerry Spears, Jr.

Further reading

 

1967 Ohio elections
Mayoral elections in Columbus, Ohio
Columbus